The following lists events that happened during 2010 in Portugal.

Incumbents
President: Aníbal Cavaco Silva
Prime Minister: José Sócrates

Events

June
5 June – Same-sex marriage became legal.

December
Portuguese Natural Gas Association is founded.

Arts and entertainment
In music: Portugal in the Eurovision Song Contest 2010.

Sports
Football (soccer) competitions: Primeira Liga, Liga de Honra, Taça da Liga, Taça de Portugal.

Deaths

9 January – Acúrsio Carrelo, footballer (born 1931).
18 June – José Saramago, novelist, poet, playwright, journalist and Nobel laureate, (born 1922)
25 July – Vasco de Almeida e Costa, naval officer and politician (born 1932)

See also
List of Portuguese films of 2010

References

 
2010s in Portugal
Portugal
Years of the 21st century in Portugal
Portugal